Paul Liebrecht König (March 20, 1867 – September 9, 1933) was a sailor and business executive.  The son of a clergyman, married to an English wife from whom he separated for the duration of the war, he is most known for two visits he made to the United States in 1916 as captain of the merchant submarine U-Deutschland.

König was a captain in the German merchant navy. In 1916 during World War I, he became a reserve Kapitänleutnant in the Imperial German Navy.

Later in 1916, König became commanding officer of the merchant submarine . He took it on two voyages to the United States for commercial purposes. He arrived at Baltimore on the night of July 9, 1916 having been towed by the tug Thomas Timminns from the Virginia Capes. The cargo was dyestuffs. While in the United States he was interviewed by newspapermen, was even the recipient of vaudeville offers, was welcomed by mayor of Baltimore and officials. On August 2 he sailed on the return voyage, later making a second voyage and putting in at New London, Connecticut.

He received the Iron Cross 1st class the same year. Following his return after the second journey, König wrote a book called Voyage of the Deutschland, which was heavily publicized, as it was intended to be used as propaganda.

König then became commanding officer of a Sperrbrechergruppe (group of blockade runners; 1917), and later was an executive at Norddeutscher Lloyd (1919–1931). He died at Gnadau, on September 9, 1933, where he is buried.

Awards and decorations
 Iron Cross, 2nd class (1915 ) and 1st class (1916)
 Hohenzollern House Order (1916)
  Honorary Doctorate from the University of Halle (Saale), Dr.med.hc (1916)

Notes

References

External links

The New York Times
 
 
 
 
 
 
 
 
 
 
 
 
 
 
 
 
 
 
 
 
 
 
 
 
 
 
 
 
 
 
 
 
 
 
 
 

1867 births
1933 deaths
People from Schmalkalden-Meiningen
People from the Province of Saxony
U-boat commanders (Imperial German Navy)
Imperial German Navy personnel of World War I
Military personnel from Thuringia